Angelo Gabriello Piò (Bologna, 1690- Bologna, 1770) was an Italian sculptor, active in Bologna in a Rococo style.

Life
In Bologna, he studied from 1711 to 1712 under Andrea Ferreri (1673–1744) . He was also a pupil of Giuseppe Maria Mazza. After 1718 he studied in Rome under Camillo Rusconi (1658-1728).

In 1721 Piò became a member of the Accademia Clementina in Bologna. He worked with some of the prime Bolognese architects of the time: Carlo Francesco Dotti, Alfonso Torreggiani and Giuseppe Antonio Ambrosi. 
His son, pupil and assistant was Domenico Piò (1715-1799). Other pupils included Filippo Scandellari (brother of Pietro) and Antonio Schiassi (died 1778).

Work

Piò mainly used stucco and colored terracotta, working in the Emilian Rococo style. He used these materials due to the scarcity of stone and marble, but was able to closely imitate stone carving. His works were mostly of religious, allegorical or mythological subjects. His more notable works include Fortitude and Prudence (Bologna, Gozzadini palace), Agony in the Garden (parish church of San Giovanni in Persiceto) and the funeral memorial of General Marsili (1733, San Domenico, Bologna).

Angelo Piò created over twenty full-length plaster statues for the Sanctuary of San Luca, from 1746 onwards. The architect Carlo Francesco Dotti designed this church. In this work he collaborated with the plasterers Antonio Calegari and Joseph Borelli, who made the scrolls with Biblical sayings, and with Gaetano Lollini, who created the statues in the second chapel on the right. He also made a commemorative posthumous bust of the architect, which remains in the church.

References
Citations

Sources

Further reading

1690 births
1770 deaths
18th-century Italian sculptors
Italian male sculptors
18th-century Italian male artists